Christopher William Napier Hart (born 1965) is an English novelist and journalist. He writes for the Sunday Times the Daily Mail and The Literary Review. He is the author of The Harvest (1999) and Rescue Me (2001), and has written seven historical novels under his two middle names, William Napier.

Bibliography

As Christopher Hart
 The Harvest (1999)
 Rescue Me (2001)

As William Napier
 Julia: An Epic Tale of Love And War Set in the Final Days of the Roman Empire (2001)
Attila (Attila: The Scourge of God) (2005)
Attila: The Gathering of the Storm (2007)
Attila: The Judgement (2008)
Clash of Empires: The Great Siege (2011) ; 
Clash of Empires: The Red Sea (5 July 2012)
The Last Crusaders: Ivan the Terrible  (2014)

Notes

1965 births
20th-century British novelists
21st-century British novelists
Napier, William
Living people
Napier, William
British male novelists
20th-century English male writers
21st-century English male writers
People educated at Cheltenham College
Alumni of Birkbeck, University of London
Alumni of Oxford Brookes University
Alumni of the University of Leicester